Sault Ste. Marie is the only city in, and county seat of, Chippewa County in the U.S. state of Michigan.  With a population of 13,337 at the 2020 census, it is the second-most populated city in the Upper Peninsula after Marquette.  It is the central city of the Sault Ste. Marie, MI Micropolitan Statistical Area, which encompasses all of Chippewa County and had a population of 38,520 at the 2010 census.        

Sault Ste. Marie is located within the traditional homelands of the Oc̣eṭi Ṡakowiƞ, Seven Fires council, of the Dakota, Lakota, and Nakoda (Sioux). Around 1300, the Anishinaabe (Ojibwe or Chippewa) began to move in from the east coast, gradually pushing the Oc̣eṭi Ṡakowiƞ westward. Europeans arrived as early as 1668, which makes it Michigan's oldest settler city and among the oldest settler cities in the United States.  Located at the northeastern edge of the Upper Peninsula, it is separated by the St. Marys River from the much-larger city of Sault Ste. Marie, Ontario.  The two are connected by the Sault Ste. Marie International Bridge, which represents the northern terminus of Interstate 75.  This portion of the river also contains the Soo Locks, as well as a swinging railroad bridge.  The city is also home to Lake Superior State University.

History

For centuries, Oc̣eṭi Ṡakowiƞ (Dakota, Lakota, Nakoda), or Sioux, people lived in the area. When the Ojibwe (Anishinaabe, or Chippewa) moved in, they named the area Baawitigong ("at the cascading rapids"), after the rapids of St. Marys River. French colonists renamed the region Saulteaux ("rapids" in French). The Oc̣eṭi Ṡakowiƞ came to call the Anishinaabe "Ḣaḣaṭuƞwaƞ", or "Dwellers of the Falls."

In 1668, French missionaries Claude Dablon and Jacques Marquette founded a Jesuit mission at this site. Sault Ste. Marie developed as the fourth-oldest European city in the United States west of the Appalachian Mountains, and the oldest permanent European settlement in contemporary Michigan state. On June 4, 1671, Simon-François Daumont de Saint-Lusson, a colonial agent, was dispatched from Quebec to the distant tribes, proposing a congress of Indian nations at the Falls of St. Mary between Lake Huron and Lake Superior. Trader Nicolas Perrot helped attract the principal chiefs, and representatives of 14 Indigenous nations were invited for the elaborate ceremony. The French officials proclaimed France's appropriation of the immense territory surrounding Lake Superior in the name of King Louis XIV.

In the 18th century, the settlement became an important center of the fur trade, when it was a post for the British-owned North West Company, based in Montreal. The fur trader John Johnston, a Scots-Irish immigrant from Belfast, was considered the first European settler in 1790. He married a high-ranking Ojibwe woman named Ozhaguscodaywayquay, the daughter of a prominent chief, Waubojeeg. She also became known as Susan Johnston. Their marriage was one of many alliances in the northern areas between high-ranking European traders and Ojibwe. The family was prominent among Native Americans, First Nations, and Europeans from both Canada and the United States. They had eight children who learned fluent Ojibwe, English and French. The Johnstons entertained a variety of trappers, explorers, traders, and government officials, especially during the years before the War of 1812 between Britain and the United States.

For more than 140 years, the settlement was a single community under French colonial, and later, British colonial rule. After the War of 1812, a US–UK Joint Boundary Commission finally fixed the border in 1817 between the Michigan Territory of the US and the British Province of Upper Canada to follow the river in this area. Whereas traders had formerly moved freely through the whole area, the United States forbade Canadian traders from operating in the United States, which reduced their trade and disrupted the area's economy. The American and Canadian communities of Sault Ste. Marie were each incorporated as independent municipalities toward the end of the 19th century.

As a result of the fur trade, the settlement attracted Ojibwe and Ottawa, Métis, and ethnic Europeans of various nationalities. It was a two-tiered society, with fur traders (who had capital) and their families and upper-class Ojibwe in the upper echelon. In the aftermath of the War of 1812, however, the community's society changed markedly.

The U.S. built Fort Brady near the settlement, introducing new troops and settlers, mostly Anglo-American. The UK and the US settled on a new northern boundary in 1817, dividing the US and Canada along St. Mary's River. The US prohibited British fur traders from operating in the United States. After completion of the Erie Canal in New York State in 1825 (expanded in 1832), the number of settlers migrating to Ohio and Michigan increased dramatically from New York and New England, bringing with them the Yankee culture of the Northern Tier. Their numbers overwhelmed the cosmopolitan culture of the earlier settlers. They practiced more discrimination against Native Americans and Métis.

The falls proved a choke point for shipping between the Great Lakes. Early ships traveling to and from Lake Superior were portaged around the rapids in a lengthy process (much like moving a house) that could take weeks. Later, only the cargoes were unloaded, hauled around the rapids, and then loaded onto other ships waiting below the rapids. The first American lock, the State Lock, was built in 1855; it was instrumental in improving shipping. The lock has been expanded and improved over the years.

In 1900, Northwestern Leather Company opened a tannery in Sault Ste. Marie. The tannery was founded to process leather for the upper parts of shoes, which was finer than that for soles. After the factory closed in 1958, the property was sold to Filborn Limestone, a subsidiary of Algoma Steel Corporation.

In March 1938 during the Great Depression, Sophia Nolte Pullar bequeathed $70,000 for construction of the Pullar Community Building, which opened in 1939. This building held an indoor ice rink composed of artificial ice, then a revolutionary concept. The ice rink is still owned by the city.

Meaning of the name
The city name was derived from the French term for the nearby rapids, which were called Les Saults de Sainte Marie. Sainte Marie (Saint Mary) was the name of the river and Saults referred to the rapids.
(The archaic spelling Sault is a relic of the Middle French Period. Latin salta successively became Old French salte (c. 800 – c. 1340), Middle French sault, and Modern French saut, as in the verb sauter, to jump.)

Whereas the modern saut means simply "(a) jump", sault in the 17th century was also applied to cataracts, waterfalls and rapids. This resulted in such place names as Grand Falls/Grand-Sault, and Sault-au-Récollet on the Island of Montreal in Canada; and Sault-Saint-Remy and Sault-Brénaz in France. In contemporary French, the word for "rapids" is rapides.

 in French means "the Rapids of Saint Mary" (for a more detailed discussion, refer to the Sault Ste. Marie, Ontario page). The Saint Mary's River runs from Lake Superior to Lake Huron, between what are now the twin border cities on either side.

No hyphens are used in the English spelling, which is otherwise identical to the French, but the pronunciations differ. Anglophones say  and Francophones say . In French, the name can be written . On both sides of the border, the towns and the general vicinity are called The Sault (usually pronounced ), or The Soo.

Transportation

M-129 also has its northern terminus in the city. M-129 was at one time a part of the Dixie Highway system, which was intended to connect the northern industrial states with the southern agricultural states. Until 1984 the city was the eastern terminus of the western segment of US 2. County Highway H-63 (or Mackinac Trail) also has its northern terminus in the city and extends south to St. Ignace and follows a route very similar to I-75. The city is joined to its Canadian counterpart by the International Bridge, which connects I-75 in Sault Ste. Marie, Michigan, and Huron Street in Sault Ste. Marie, Ontario. 

Smaller general aviation aircraft also use the Sault Ste.

Sault Ste. Marie was the namesake of the Minneapolis, St. Paul and Sault Ste. Marie Railway, now the Soo Line Railroad, the U.S. arm of the Canadian Pacific Railway. This railroad had a bridge parallel to the International Bridge crossing the St. Marys River. The Soo Line has since, through a series of acquisitions and mergers of portions of the system, been split between Canadian Pacific and Canadian National Railway (CN). Canadian National operates the rail lines and the bridge in the Sault Ste. Marie area that were part of the Soo Line.

The Sugar Island Ferry provides automobile and passenger access between Sault Ste. Marie and Sugar Island, formerly a center of maple sugaring. The short route that the ferry travels crosses the shipping channel. Despite the high volume of freighter traffic through the locks, freighters typically do not dock in the Sault. However, the city hosts tugs, a tourist passenger ferry service, and a Coast Guard station along the shoreline on the lower (east) side of the Soo Locks. The United States Postal Service operates a "Marine Post Office", situated within the locks, to service ships as they pass through.

Shipping traffic in the Great Lakes system bypasses the rapids in the St. Marys River via the American Soo Locks. Locally, it is often claimed to be the world's busiest canal in terms of tonnage passing through it. These are domestic carriers (called lakers). Smaller recreational and tour boats use the Canadian Sault Ste. Marie Canal. The lakers, being too large to transit the Welland Canal that bypasses Niagara Falls, are therefore land-locked. Foreign ships (termed salties) are smaller and can exit the Great Lakes to the St. Lawrence River and the Atlantic Ocean.

Geography and climate
The city is located at 46°49'N 84°35'W.

The city's downtown is on an island, formed by the Sault Ste. Marie Power Canal to the south and the St. Mary's River and Soo Locks to the north.

Climate
Under the Köppen climate classification, Sault Ste. Marie has a humid continental climate (Dfb) with cold, snowy winters and warm summers. Sault Ste. During this time, the city proper experienced a far greater level of snowfall than the farmlands past the canal and riverfront due to lake-effect snow. This caused the 1437th MRBC National Guard local armory to be mobilized for disaster relief in order to remove hundreds of tons of snow which effectively blockaded people within their own homes. Precipitation measured as equivalent rainfall, Sault Ste. Its immediate region is the cloudiest in Michigan's Upper Peninsula, having over 200 cloudy days a year.

Temperatures in Sault Ste.

Average monthly precipitation is lowest in February, and highest in September and October. This autumn maximum in precipitation, unusual for humid continental climates, owes to this area's Great Lakes location. From May through July (usually the year's wettest months in most of the upper Midwestern United States, away from large bodies of water), the lake waters surrounding Sault Ste. Marie are cooler than nearby land areas. This tends to stabilize the atmosphere, suppressing precipitation (especially showers and thunderstorms) somewhat, in May, June and July. In autumn, the lakes are releasing their stored heat from the summer, making them warmer than the surrounding land, and increasingly frequent and strong polar and Arctic air outbreaks pick up warmth and moisture during their over-water passage, resulting in clouds and instability showers. In Sault Ste. Marie, this phenomenon peaks in September and October, making these the wettest months of the year. Also noteworthy is that in Sault Ste. Marie, the year's third wettest month, on average, is November, and not any summer month.

Notes

Demographics

2020 census
As of the census of 2020, the population was 13,337. The racial makeup of the city was 68.9% White, 17.8% Native American, 1.0% Black or African American, 0.9% Asian, 0.8% from other races, and 10.7% from two or more races. Ethnically, the population was 2.4% Hispanic or Latino of any race.

2010 census
As of the census of 2010, there were 14,144 people, 5,995 households, and 3,265 families residing in the city. The racial makeup of the city was 74.8% White, 0.7% African American, 17.7% Native American, 0.9% Asian, 0.1% Pacific Islander, 0.3% from other races, and 5.5% from two or more races. Hispanic or Latino of any race were 1.5% of the population.

There were 5,995 households, of which 28.1% had children under the age of 18 living with them, 35.0% were married couples living together, 14.5% had a female householder with no husband present, 5.0% had a male householder with no wife present, and 45.5% were non-families. 35.7% of all households were made up of individuals, and 12.8% had someone living alone who was 65 years of age or older. The average household size was 2.22 and the average family size was 2.88.

The median age in the city was 33.8 years. 21.3% of residents were under the age of 18; 17.1% were between the ages of 18 and 24; 23.8% were from 25 to 44; 23.8% were from 45 to 64; and 13.9% were 65 years of age or older. The gender makeup of the city was 48.5% male and 51.5% female.

2000 census

Note: After going through the Census 2000 Count Question Resolution Program, the population of the city in 2000 was revised to 14,324 because of the misallocation of some of a neighboring municipality's population to the city of Sault Ste. Marie.

As of the census of 2000, there were 16,542 people, 5,742 households, and 3,301 families living in the city. The racial makeup of the city was 73.99% White, 6.51% African American, 13.72% Native American, 0.65% Asian, 0.05% Pacific Islander, 0.47% from other races, and 4.61% from two or more races. Hispanic or Latino of any race were 1.86% of the population.

There were 5,742 households, out of which 28.8% had children under the age of 18 living with them, 39.9% were married couples living together, 13.2% had a female householder with no husband present, and 42.5% were non-families. 33.8% of all households were made up of individuals, and 13.3% had someone living alone who was 65 years of age or older. The average household size was 2.28 and the average family size was 2.92.

In the city, the population was spread out, with 19.4% under the age of 18, 18.1% from 18 to 24, 31.9% from 25 to 44, 18.2% from 45 to 64, and 12.5% who were 65 years of age or older. The median age was 33 years. For every 100 females, there were 122.0 males. For every 100 females age 18 and over, there were 128.3 males.

The median income for a household in the city was $29,652, and for a family was $40,333. Males had a median income of $29,656 versus $21,889 for females. The per capita income for the city was $14,460. About 12.7% of families and 17.5% of the population were below the poverty line, including 19.6% of those under age 18 and 12.5% of those age 65 or over.

Economy
Tourism is a major industry in the area. The Soo Locks and nearby Kewadin Casino, Hotel and Convention Center—which is owned by the Sault Tribe of Chippewa Indians—are the major draws, as well as the forests, inland lakes, and Lake Superior shoreline. Sault Ste. Marie is also a gateway to Lake Superior's scenic north shore through its twin city Sault Ste. Marie, Ontario. The two cities are connected by the Sault Ste. Marie International Bridge, a steel truss arch bridge with suspended deck passing over the St. Marys River.

Education

University
Sault Ste. Marie is home to Lake Superior State University (LSSU), founded in 1946 as an extension campus of Michigan College of Mining and Technology (now Michigan Technological University); the campus was originally Fort Brady. LSSU is home to the LSSU Lakers (D1 Hockey (CCHA), D2 all other sports (GLIAC). LSSU has around 1500 students, making it Michigan's smallest public university.

Primary and secondary education
The area school district is Sault Ste. Marie Area Schools.

The Sault's primary public high school is Sault Area High School (SAHS). "Sault High" is one of the few high schools in the state with attached career center. The school's mascot is the Blue Devil. "Sault High" houses a variety of successful varsity sports teams, such as hockey, wrestling, baseball, and basketball. Altogether, the school provides 24 competitive sports teams for both boys and girls at all levels. 
 The school district also operates Malcolm High School as an alternative high school.

Sault Ste. Marie has two middle schools, one in the Sault Ste. Marie School System known as Sault Area Middle School. Before the 6th grade annex was added in the late 1980s, the school was referred to as Sault Area Junior High School. The Second Middle School is a part of Joseph K. Lumsden Bahweting School, a Native American-affiliated Public School Academy.

There are two elementary schools in Sault Ste. Marie, Lincoln Elementary and Washington Elementary. There is also a Public School Academy, Joseph K. Lumsden Bahweting School, and the St. Mary's Catholic School. Jefferson Elementary, McKinley Elementary, Bruce Township Elementary, and Soo Township Elementary (converted into an Alternative High School) have closed because of declining enrollment in the school system.

St. Mary's Catholic School serves students in grades K–8. It is affiliated with the Roman Catholic Diocese of Marquette.

There is a Bureau of Indian Education-affiliated tribal school, Joseph K. Lumsden Bahweting Anishnabe School. It was established in 1994 and received its current name in 1998.

Media

TV

All stations listed here are rebroadcasters of television stations based in Traverse City and Cadillac.

 Channel 8: WGTQ, ABC (rebroadcasts WGTU); NBC on digital subchannel 8.2 (rebroadcasts WPBN-TV), Charge! on digital subchannel 8.3
 Channel 10: WWUP, CBS (rebroadcasts WWTV); Fox on digital subchannel 10.2 (rebroadcasts WFQX-TV), MeTV on digital subchannel 10.3, Laff on digital subchannel 10.4, QVC on digital subchannel 10.5, and HSN on digital subchannel 10.6
 Channel 28: W28DY-D, 3ABN (all programming via satellite)

NBC and ABC are also served by WTOM channel 4 from Cheboygan, which repeats WPBN-TV and WGTU. The market can also receive select over the air channels from Sault Ste. Marie, Ontario, including Global Toronto on channel 12.1 at CIII-DT-12, and CTV Northern Ontario on analog channel 2 at CHBX. Channel 8.3 was previously the science fiction network Comet until being replaced by Charge!, which is also operated by the Sinclair Broadcast Group.

The area has no local PBS, The CW, or MyNetworkTV service over-the-air. The Spectrum cable system offers all three in their regional packages through Marquette's PBS affiliate WNMU-TV, Cadillac's CW affiliate WFQX-CW, and joint MyNetworkTV/Cozi TV affiliate WXII-LD out of Cedar. Mount Pleasant PBS affiliate WCMU-TV serves the Cadillac-Traverse City market via Cadillac satellite station WCMV, but its nearest over the air signal from  WCML Alpena does not reach the Sault Ste. Marie area.

None of these stations are seen on cable in Sault Ste. Marie, Ontario, as Shaw Cable chooses to largely air Detroit affiliates for over the air channels, while WUHF in Rochester, New York, WPIX in New York City, New York, and WSBK-TV in Boston, Massachusetts provide the closest Fox, CW, and MNTV affiliates carried by Shaw in the market.

Radio

 1230 AM – WSOO (adult contemporary/news/sports)
 1400 AM – WKNW (talk/sports)
 91.5 FM – WJOH (Contemporary Christian) "Smile FM" (rebroadcasts WLGH from Lansing)
 98.3 FM – WCMZ (NPR/jazz) (rebroadcasts WCMU-FM from Mount Pleasant)
 99.5 FM – WYSS (contemporary hit radio)
 101.3 FM – WSUE (active rock)
 102.3 FM – WTHN (religious) (rebroadcasts WPHN-FM from Gaylord)
 103.3 FM – W277AG (religious) (rebroadcasts WHWL-FM from Marquette)
 The 46th Parallel Radio (college radio) (internet station broadcast from Lake Superior State University; previously on WLSO 90.1 FM)

Other stations serving the Sault Ste. Marie, Michigan, market:

 93.9 FM – WNBY (oldies) – Newberry, Michigan
 95.1 FM – WUPN (classic hits) – Paradise, Michigan
 97.9 FM – WIHC (Christian radio) – Newberry, Michigan
 105.5 FM – WMKD (country music) – Pickford, Michigan

Print
The city's main daily paper is The Sault News, formerly the Sault Evening News.

 Athletics 
Spectator sports in Sault Ste. Marie include Lake Superior State University Athletics and the Soo Eagles of the Northern Ontario Junior Hockey League (NOJHL). The Lakers participate in NCAA Division I Ice Hockey and Division II Women's and Men's Basketball, Women's and Men's Golf, Women's Volleyball, Women's and Men's Track and Field, Women's and Men's Tennis and Women's and Men's Cross Country.  

Nicknamed the Lakers, LSSU's hockey program is celebrating its 50th season of intercollegiate competition. The team plays its home contests at Taffy Abel Arena (4,000 seats) on LSSU's campus and is one of the most decorated in NCAA hockey history. The squad claimed two NAIA titles in the 1970s before a run of three NCAA division one championships (1988, 1992, 1994) and one finalist appearance (1993) in the late 1980s and early 90s. They compete in the Western Collegiate Hockey Association (WCHA).

The rest of the athletic teams play in the Great Lakes Intercollegiate Athletic Conference (GLIAC). The basketball programs at LSSU have seen their share of success. The Men's program won overall GLIAC regular season titles in 2014–15, 2013–14, 1995-1996 (Tournament Champion) and also claimed the north division crown in 2008–09. LSSU's women's program won GLIAC gold from 2001 to 2002 through 2004–05. They also captured GLIAC tournament titles in 2002-03 and 2003–04. Both Men's and Women's squads play their home games in the Bud Cooper Gymnasium within the Norris Center.

Sault Ste. Marie is the home of the International 500 Snowmobile Race (commonly called the I-500), which takes place annually and draws participants and spectators from all over the U.S. and Canada. The race, which was inspired by the Indianapolis 500, originated in 1969 and has been growing ever since.

Notable people
 Taffy Abel, former Olympic and NHL player
 Cliff Barton, former NHL player
 Bob Bemer, computer scientist
 Jeff Blashill, assistant coach with the NHL's Tampa Bay Lightning and former head coach of the NHL's Detroit Red Wings; born in Detroit but grew up in Sault Ste. Marie, where his father was a professor at Lake Superior State University
 Rosalynn Bliss, Mayor of Grand Rapids 
 Denton G. Burdick, Oregon state legislator
 Vic Desjardins, former NHL player
 John Johnston (1762–1828), married to Ozhaguscodaywayquay (also known as Susan), daughter of Waubojeeg, an Ojibwe chief; together they built a prosperous fur trading business; among upper class in Euro-American and Ojibwe communities of region during late-18th and early-19th centuries
 Lloyd H. Kincaid, former Wisconsin State Senator
 Bruce Martyn, radio and TV play-by-play announcer of the Detroit Red Wings from 1964 to 1995; graduated from Lake Superior State University and began his radio career at WSOO
 Bun LaPrairie, former NHL player
 William McPherson, author and Washington Post writer, was born in Sault Ste. Marie
 Tip O'Neill, former NFL player
 Terry O'Quinn, best known for playing John Locke from the ABC show Lost, was born in Sault Ste. Marie
 Chase S. Osborn, Michigan's only Governor from the Upper Peninsula
 Henry Rowe Schoolcraft, ethnographer and U.S. Indian agent who named many counties and places in Michigan in his official capacity; husband of Jane Johnston Schoolcraft
 Jane Johnston Schoolcraft, daughter of John and Susan Johnston, recognized as the first Native American literary writer and poet, and inducted into Michigan Women's Hall of Fame in 2008
 Joseph H. Steere, Chief Justice of the Michigan Supreme Court
 Reed Timmer, American meteorologist and extreme storm chaser
 Kim A. Wilcox, Chancellor of UC Riverside

Notable landmarks
 Pullar Stadium was constructed starting in 1937 and opened in 1939. It is used as an ice arena where the Soo Eagles play.
 The Ramada Plaza Hotel Ojiway opened on December 31, 1927. The first owners were Beatrice and Leon Daglman. The building is 95 years old. The 27th Governor of Michigan Chase S. Osborn donated the site and $50,000. It was his dream to build a nice elegant hotel. Overall, it cost $250,000 to build it. On the day of its opening it had 91 rooms, 33 of which included bath tubs, 13 with showers, 34 with toilet and washbowls, and 11 just had a washbowl. This hotel was made for all the tourist who came to the town. Governor Chase S. Osborn and his family lived on the sixth floor for a while and so did Beatrice and Leon Daglman. The hotel contains 100 guestrooms, dining room, checkroom, barbershop and beauty parlor. Its decorated as an Art Deco architectural design, décor, detailed amenities and exceptional service gained national interest and attracted many famous guests including Jack Dempsey, Joe Louis and more recently President George H.W. Bush in 1992
The Soo Theatre has been a part of Sault Ste. Marie for over 80 years and has provided entertainment of live plays, movies, and musicals. The Theatre opened in March 1930 and for 40 years was used for films and live performances. In May 1974 the theater was divided into red and blue cinemas, where a cement wall divided the once open auditorium. The building was then closed in 1998 and was put up for sale. In March 2003 the Soo Theatre Project Inc. purchased it for $85,000. After that the theater began restoration so plays and other types of entertainment could be put on once again.
Holy Name of Mary Pro-Cathedral (Sault Ste. Marie, Michigan) was begun by Jesuits in 1668. There are only two other parishes, one in St. Augustine, Florida and the other in Santa Fe, New Mexico, that are older in the United States.[3] On January 9, 1857 Pope Pius IX established the Diocese of Sault Ste. Marie[4] and St. Mary's was named the cathedral church for the new diocese. The present church, the fifth for the parish, was built in 1881. It was designed by Canadian architect Joseph Connolly in the Gothic Revival style. The church was extensively remodeled in three phases from the mid-1980s to the mid-1990s. In 1968 the parish built the Tower of History as a shrine to the Catholic missionaries who served the community.[5] It was designed to be a part of a larger complex that was to include a community center and a new church. Parish priorities changed and the structure was sold to Sault Historic Sites in 1980, who continues to operate it. Proceeds from the Tower of History still benefit the church.
The Soo Locks are a set of parallel locks which enable ships to travel between Lake Superior and the lower Great Lakes. They are on the St. Marys River between Lake Superior and Lake Huron, between the Upper Peninsula of the U.S. state of Michigan and the Canadian province of Ontario. They bypass the rapids of the river, where the water falls 21 feet (7 m). The locks pass an average of 10,000 ships per year,[4] despite being closed during the winter from January through March, when ice shuts down shipping on the Great Lakes. The winter closure period is used to inspect and maintain the locks. The locks share a name (usually shortened and anglicized as Soo) with the two cities named Sault Ste. Marie, in Ontario and in Michigan, on either side of the St. Marys River. The Sault Ste. Marie International Bridge between the United States and Canada permits vehicular traffic to pass over the locks. A railroad bridge crosses the St. Marys River just upstream of the highway bridge.
Taffy Abel Arena is the home of Lake Superior State University's Division 1 hockey team. The 4,000-seat arena is part of the Norris Center athletic complex on LSSU's campus. It was renovated in 1995 and is named after Clarence "Taffy" Abel. Abel was the first American born player to become an NHL regular and was born in the Soo.
Lake Superior State University sits on the former site of U.S. Army's Fort Brady. The university has converted most of the buildings to serve housing and administrative needs for its students, faculty, guests and employees. The 115-acre campus includes several buildings which are listed in the National Register of Historic Places. The university has an enrollment of around 2500 students.

Sister cities

  Sault Ste. Marie, Ontario, Canada (also twin city)

See also
 Media in Sault Ste. Marie, Ontario

 References 

Further reading

External links

 Sault Ste. Marie Visitors Bureau
 City of Sault Ste. MarieTocqueville in Sault Ste. Marie – Segment from C-SPAN's Alexis de Tocqueville Tour''
 

 
Populated places established in 1668
1668 establishments in New France
Populated places on the Great Lakes
County seats in Michigan
Cities in Chippewa County, Michigan
Inland port cities and towns of the United States
Micropolitan areas of Michigan